Wondair (Wondair On Demand Aviation) was an air charter company based in Valencia, Spain. It operates on demand business and executive services. Its main base was Valencia Airport while the management office was located in the Valencian town of Alzira.

Fleet 
As of December 2006 the Wondair fleet includes:

Cessna 560 Citation Ultra
Raytheon B200 King Air

References

External links 
Wondair

Defunct airlines of Spain
Airlines established in 1990